NGC 803 is a spiral galaxy located in the constellation Aries about 70 million light-years from the Milky Way. It was discovered by the German–British astronomer William Herschel in 1784.

See also 
 List of NGC objects (1–1000)

Gallery

References

External links 
 

0803
Unbarred spiral galaxies
Aries (constellation)
007849